The W.H. Moore House is a historic house at 906 Malvern Street in Hot Springs, Arkansas.  It is a -story wood-frame house, with a hip roof, weatherboard siding, and a brick foundation.  It has asymmetrical massing typical of the Queen Anne period, including projecting gables and window bays, a wraparound porch, and a corner turret.  The porch details, however, are distinctively Colonial Revival, with heavier clustered posts supporting its roof.  The house was built in the late 19th century for W.H. Moore, owner of the Valley Planing Mill, the city's only business of that type.

The house was listed on the National Register of Historic Places in 1990.

See also
National Register of Historic Places listings in Garland County, Arkansas

References

Houses on the National Register of Historic Places in Arkansas
Queen Anne architecture in Arkansas
Colonial Revival architecture in Arkansas
Houses completed in 1895
Houses in Hot Springs, Arkansas
National Register of Historic Places in Hot Springs, Arkansas